Jerry Boyes is a former American football coach and college athletics administrator. Boyes was the head coach of the Buffalo State Bengals football program from 1986 to 2000 and again from 2009 to 2018, compiling a record of 138–116. He later served as the athletic director at Buffalo State from 1999 to 2020.

Head coaching record

References

External links
 Buffalo State profile

Year of birth missing (living people)
Living people
American football quarterbacks
Buffalo State Bengals athletic directors
Buffalo State Bengals football coaches
Ithaca Bombers football coaches
Ithaca Bombers football players